Rupnagar is a locality of Guwahati, a city in Northeast India in the state Assam. It is surrounded by the localities of Bhangagarh and Birubari. It is named after Late Rupnath Brahma, one of the architects of modern Assam and long serving minister in the Assam Government.fff

Geography
Rupnagar is located next to the city center of Bhangagarh where the Guwahati Medical College is located. It is well connected to the rest of the city by different means of transportation.

See also
 Bhetapara
 Rehabari
There is also a Rupnagar in Punjab (India), which is currently called as Ropar.

References

Neighbourhoods in Guwahati